Leptinus is a genus of mammal-nest beetles in the family Leiodidae, sometimes referred to as "mouse nest beetles". There are at least 3 described species in Leptinus.

Species
 Leptinus americanus LeConte, 1866
 Leptinus occidentamericanus Peck, 1982
 Leptinus orientamericanus Peck, 1982

References

 Majka C, Langor D (2008). "The Leiodidae (Coleoptera) of Atlantic Canada: new records, faunal composition, and zoogeography". ZooKeys 2: 357–402.
 Peck, Stewart B. / Arnett, Ross H. Jr. and Michael C. Thomas, eds. (2001). "Family 19. Leiodidae Fleming, 1821". American Beetles, vol. 1: Archostemata, Myxophaga, Adephaga, Polyphaga: Staphyliniformia, 250–258.

Further reading

 Arnett, R.H. Jr., M. C. Thomas, P. E. Skelley and J. H. Frank. (eds.). (2002). American Beetles, Volume II: Polyphaga: Scarabaeoidea through Curculionoidea. CRC Press LLC, Boca Raton, FL.
 
 Richard E. White. (1983). Peterson Field Guides: Beetles. Houghton Mifflin Company.

Leiodidae